Path integral may refer to:
 Line integral, the integral of a function along a curve
 Functional integration, the integral of a functional over a space of curves
 Path integral formulation by Richard Feynman of quantum mechanics